Delta County is the name of several counties in the United States:

Delta County, Colorado 
Delta County, Michigan 
Delta County, Texas

See also
Delta (disambiguation)